Reginald Erskine Foster (16 April 1878 – 13 May 1914), nicknamed Tip Foster, commonly designated R. E. Foster in sporting literature, was an English first-class cricketer and footballer. He is the only man to have captained England at both sports.

One of seven Foster brothers who were all educated at Malvern College and who all played cricket for Malvern and for Worcestershire, Foster was a right-handed middle-order batsman. In 1903 he scored 287 on Test debut, setting a world record for the highest Test score.

Cricket career

Foster was educated at Malvern College and University College, Oxford. He first played for Oxford University Cricket Club in 1897; in addition to cricket, he also represented Oxford at football, racquets and golf. However, although he did fairly well, it was not until 1899 that his beautiful and immaculate driving to the off-side made him into one of the finest batsmen of his time. He had played for Worcestershire while they were still a minor county but in 1899, their inaugural season as a first-class county, he and his brother Wilfrid Foster both scored two hundreds in a match (against Hampshire), a feat which remains unique in county cricket. In 1900, as captain of Oxford, he scored 171 to set the record for the highest individual score in the Varsity Match, and he scored 102 not out and 136 for the Gentlemen against the Players at Lord's, the first man to score two centuries in a match in the Gentleman v Players series. In total, Foster scored 930 runs at an average of 77.5 for Oxford in the 1900 season, a record in University cricket.

For these performances, Foster was named a Wisden Cricketer of the Year in 1901 and the following year a superb run of form for Worcestershire resulted in him scoring 1,957 runs, at an average of 54.36. However, business prevented him representing the Marylebone Cricket Club (MCC) in Australia the following year and England undoubtedly missed his brilliant batting. Moreover, apart from one match against Warwickshire, he could devote no time to first-class cricket in May and June 1902, ruling him out of contention for an England place against Australia.

In 1903, his appearances were restricted to three matches in June and August, but England were desperate for a captain for that winter's Ashes tour. Foster was (oddly) able to arrange to be away from England. Although one might have feared that he would be out of practice, in the first Test at Sydney in 1903, Foster scored 287. This was the highest score in Test cricket until 1930 (surpassed by Andy Sandham), and remains the highest score by a debutant and the third highest by a batsman of any nationality against Australia, home or away (surpassed only by Len Hutton's 364 in 1938 & Ross Taylor's 290 in 2015). For more than a century, Foster also held the record for the highest score in a test match at the SCG, his score not being beaten until Australian Michael Clarke scored 329 not out against India in January 2012. Foster did not follow it up, until the final Test on a vicious wicket at Melbourne, where he top-scored in both innings with 18 (in a total of 61 all out) and, having been promoted to open, an excellent 30 (out of 101 all out).

In the following three seasons Foster could spare no time for cricket, apart from August 1905 (when he scored 246 on his first appearance), but in 1907 he was able to find time to play regularly from the beginning of June. His batting was as good as ever in a summer of appalling wickets and helped Worcestershire (fourteenth of sixteen counties in 1906) to rise to equal second with Yorkshire. He captained England in the three-match series against South Africa in 1907, winning one match and drawing two. Offered the captaincy of the MCC for the 1907/1908 Ashes tour, Foster declined because business commitments were monopolising his attention.

After the Third Test of 1907 he could spare time for only two more first-class matches, one in 1910 (when he scored 133 against Yorkshire) and one in 1912. However, in Saturday club cricket, he never lost his brilliance. In one club match in 1909 he scored 261 in just 75 minutes.

Football career

In football, Foster played as a forward for the Corinthians in the early 1900s, scoring 22 goals in 26 matches. He also played for Old Malvernians, a team made up of ex pupils from Malvern College.

He played five matches for England between 1900 and 1902, making his debut against Wales on 26 March 1900. In his second game, against Ireland at the Dell, Southampton, he scored his first international goal in a 3–0 victory. C. B. Fry played at full-back in the same game. Foster was awarded the captaincy against Wales in his final appearance on 3 March 1902, which ended in a 0–0 draw. During his short England career he scored two goals.

He also played one match for England Amateurs against Germany, on 21 September 1901, at White Hart Lane, London. He scored 6 (one source gives 7) in a 12-0 win.

Business career
Foster was a member of the stock exchange.

Death
By 1913 it was clear Foster was suffering severely from diabetes. A trip to South Africa failed to help him recover and he died in May 1914 at the age of 36.

References

Bibliography
 H S Altham, A History of Cricket, Volume 1 (to 1914), George Allen & Unwin, 1926

External links

 CricketArchive – profile of Reginald Foster
 Cricinfo page on R E Foster

England Test cricketers
England Test cricket captains
Cricketers who made a century on Test debut
English cricketers
English footballers
England international footballers
Oxford University A.F.C. players
Oxford University cricketers
Wisden Cricketers of the Year
Worcestershire cricketers
Worcestershire cricket captains
Corinthian F.C. players
People educated at Malvern College
Alumni of University College, Oxford
People from Malvern, Worcestershire
1878 births
1914 deaths
Deaths from diabetes
Gentlemen cricketers
Marylebone Cricket Club cricketers
Association football forwards
RE
C. I. Thornton's XI cricketers
W. G. Grace's XI cricketers
Sportspeople from Worcestershire
Marylebone Cricket Club Australian Touring Team cricketers